Frankland Peak is a mountain in South West Tasmania.  It lies on the southeastern end of the Frankland Range near the impoundment Lake Pedder.  It is west of Secheron Peak and north of Right Angle Peak.

See also
Strathgordon, Tasmania
South West Wilderness, Tasmania

References
 Solitary 4224, Edition 1 2001, Tasmania 1:25000 Series, Tasmap

Mountains of Tasmania
South West Tasmania